Nonnen may refer to:

 Nonnen-see, a lake in the borough of Bergen auf Rügen, Vorpommern-Rügen district, in the German state of Mecklenburg-Vorpommern.
 Emily Nonnen, a British-Swedish writer, translator and artist